Rafael Eguzkiza Aurrekoetxea (usually written as Egusquiza Aurrecoechea in Spanish literature, 5 February 1912 – 3 May 1981) was a Spanish footballer from Erandio in the Basque Country who played as a goalkeeper. He is most remembered for being part of the Basque Country national football team on its 1937/38 tour of Europe and America.

Career
His career began at Apurtuarte Club, his home town football club. In 1932 he joined Arenas Club de Getxo, which had been one of the founding members of La Liga just four years earlier in 1928.  The first match in which he started was on 13 March 1932 against Real Unión, which Arenas won 5-0. In 1935 Arenas Club de Getxo were relegated to the second division.  Eguzkiza almost signed for a different club, but finally stayed with Arenas for that season. In 1936 Real Madrid offered to buy Eguzkiza, but with the out-break of the Spanish Civil War in the same year the national leagues were suspended.  In total Eguzkiza had played 50 matches in La Liga, and 14 in the second division. 

In 1937 Eguzkiza was chosen to join the Basque Country national team as substitute goalkeeper for their tour of Europe.  The purpose of this tour was to raise money for the refugees who had fled Spain, and also as a form of propaganda to let the world know that there was a Basque government resisting the fascist rebels. The team traveled through France, Czechoslovakia, Poland, the Soviet Union, Norway and Denmark in the spring and summer of 1937 and had great success.

In the summer of 1937 the Basque Country was captured by the rebel fascist army.  Most of players in the squad decided not to return there and instead to stick together and travel to Mexico to continue the tour there.  Shortly after their arrival in Mexico Blasco, the main goalkeeper, became injured and Eguzkiza was called up to play many matches.  The team played 10 matches in Mexico before travelling to Cuba in 1938 to play 4 more.  The team continued on to Argentina, but there they were not allowed to play due to a ruling from FIFA.  The team stayed 3 months in Argentina without playing.  

During this time Eguzkiza developed a problem with his lungs and became seriously ill. Eventually the team decided to return to Mexico, passing through Cuba again in June 1938.  When the team reached Cuba Eguzkiza's problem worsened and he was hospitalized.  Eventually he had a lung removed. His playing career ended here.  However a few months later he returned to Mexico where he was reunited with his team mates, although he remained hospitalised for some time in the Sanatorio Español in Mexico City.  In June 1939 the members of the Basque Country national football team decided to go their separate ways. Most joined league teams based in Mexico City.  Eguzkiza joined Club España as a coach.

References 

1981 deaths
Association football goalkeepers
1912 births
Footballers from the Basque Country (autonomous community)
Expatriate footballers in Mexico
Arenas Club de Getxo footballers
La Liga players
Spanish footballers
People from Erandio
Spanish expatriate footballers
Spanish expatriate sportspeople in Mexico
Spanish emigrants to Mexico
Segunda División players
Sportspeople from Biscay